Hardikpreet Singh (born 17 February 2002) is a Hong Kong-born Indian professional footballer who currently plays as a forward for Hong Kong Premier League club Southern District.

Club career
Singh began his club career with Southern Reserves in 2020.

On 17 September 2021, Singh signed with Hong Kong Premier League club HKFC on a one-year deal. He then appeared in 2021–22 Sapling Cup.

On 22 August 2022, after spending one season with HKFC, Singh rejoined Southern.

Career statistics

Club

Notes

References

External links
Hardikpreet Singh at fmdataba.com
Hardikpreet Singh at fminside.net

Living people
2002 births
Hong Kong people of Indian descent
Hong Kong footballers
Indian footballers
Association football forwards
Hong Kong Premier League players
Hong Kong FC players
Southern District FC players
Indian expatriate footballers